The 2022 IMSA Prototype Challenge was the seventeenth and final season of the IMSA Lites series and its successors, and the sixth under the IMSA Prototype Challenge name. The season started on January 21 at Daytona International Speedway and concluded on October 1 at Michelin Raceway Road Atlanta.

Calendar 
The provisional 2022 calendar was released on August 6, 2021 at IMSA's annual State of the Sport Address, featuring five rounds.

Calendar Changes
All races are now 1 hour 30 minutes in length, apart from the opening round at Daytona.
Canadian Tire Motorsport Park (Mosport) returned to the calendar after being cancelled for 2020 and 2021 due to the COVID-19 pandemic.
Sebring International Raceway did not return for 2022. Watkins Glen International, which served as the replacement for Canadian Tire Motorsport Park in 2021, also did not return to the schedule.

Series News 
2015-spec LMP3 machinery would no longer be permitted to compete from 2022 onwards, returning the series to a single class consisting entirely of 2020-spec machinery.

Entry list

Race results

Championship standings

Points system
Championship points are awarded in each class at the finish of each event. Points are awarded based on finishing positions in the race as shown in the chart below.

Driver's Championship

†: Post-event penalty. Car moved to back of class.

Bronze Driver's Cup
{|
|

†: Post-event penalty. Car moved to back of class.

Team's Championship
{|
|

†: Post-event penalty. Car moved to back of class.

References

External links 
 Official Website

IMSA Prototype Challenge
IMSA Prototype Challenge
IMSA Prototype Challenge
2022 IMSA Prototype Challenge